Cameron "Cam" Hillis (born June 24, 2000) is a Canadian professional ice hockey forward currently playing for the Rockford IceHogs in the American Hockey League (AHL) while under contract to the Chicago Blackhawks of the National Hockey League (NHL). He was selected 66th overall by the Montreal Canadiens in the 2018 NHL Entry Draft.

Playing career 
Hillis played Canadian High School hockey with St. Andrew's College and also featured in the Conference of Independent Schools Athletic Association league. He was selected 28th overall in the 2016 OHL Priority Selection draft by the Guelph Storm and was later committed to join the major junior club for the 2017–18 OHL season.

In his rookie season with the Storm, Hillis lead the league in assists among rookies with 39 and added 20 goals to finish with 59 points through 60 games to earn a selection to the OHL First All-Rookie Team. He was later selected in the third-round, 66th overall, by the Montreal Canadiens in the 2018 NHL Entry Draft.

Following a successful three season junior career with the Storm, claiming the OHL championship in the 2018–19 season, Hillis was signed to a three-year, entry-level contract with the Montreal Canadiens on May 13, 2020.

In turning pro, Hillis appeared in the pandemic shortened 2020–21 season with the Canadiens AHL affiliate, the Laval Rocket. He was limited to just 18 games, in registering 1 goal.

In the following  season, Hillis began the season assigned to the Canadiens secondary affiliate, the Trois-Rivières Lions in the ECHL, before continuing his tenure with the Laval Rocket in the AHL. On December 27, 2021, with the Canadiens suffering a spate of injury and covid-related absences, Hillis was added to the taxi squad. He made his NHL debut with the Canadiens on January 1, 2022, featuring on the fourth-line in a 5–2 defeat against the Florida Panthers. After his solitary game with Montreal, he was later returned to the minor leagues for the remainder of the campaign.

Entering the final season of his entry-level contract, Hillis for a second consecutive year was assigned to begin the  season in the ECHL with the Trois-Rivières Lions. Hillis contributed with 2 goals in 3 games with the Lions before he was traded by the Canadiens to the Chicago Blackhawks in exchange for Nicolas Beaudin on October 26, 2022. He was immediately reassigned by the Blackhawks to join AHL affiliate, the Rockford Icehogs.

Career statistics

Regular season and playoffs

International

Awards and honours

References

External links
 

2000 births
Living people
Guelph Storm players
Indy Fuel players
Laval Rocket players
Montreal Canadiens draft picks
Montreal Canadiens players
Rockford IceHogs (AHL) players
Trois-Rivières Lions players